Richard John Charles "Digby" Fairweather (born 25 April 1946) is a British jazz cornetist, author and broadcaster.

Biography
Before becoming a professional musician, Fairweather was a librarian and has retained an interest in jazz bibliography and archiving.

He led his first band, Dig's Half Dozen, in 1971 and recorded in 1973 with Alex Welsh. Four years later, he was a member of the band Velvet, with Ike Isaacs, Len Skeat, and Denny Wright, then a member of the Midnite Follies Orchestra and the Pizza Express All-Stars. In the early 1980s, he started a band that performed music by Nat Gonella. He worked as a sideman for George Chisholm, Alex Welsh, Tiny Winters, and Brian Priestley. In the 1980s and 1990s, he led the Jazz Superkings, the Great British Jazz Band, and the Half Dozen. During the 1990s, he was part of the Salute to Satchmo. Fairweather and Stan Barker started the Jazz College charity to introduce improvisation in schools. He established the Association of British Jazz Musicians, The Jazz Centre UK and the National Jazz Archive. He wrote Jazz: The Essential Companion (1987) with Brian Priestley and Ian Carr. In 2000 it was renamed The Rough Guide to Jazz.

Fairweather's musical style has been influenced by Louis Armstrong, Ruby Braff, Billy Butterfield, Bobby Hackett, Red Nichols, and Gonella. Digby's Half Dozen toured and recorded with singer George Melly in the later years of his career (2003–2007). Fairweather's band toured with singer Paul Jones in their presentation Rocking in Rhythm in 2007.

Apart from his playing and group leading, Fairweather has long pursued a parallel career as a jazz broadcaster and writer. From 1985 to 1988, he worked and recorded with Brian Priestley's Special Septet and Tony Milliner's Mingus Music, and wrote the book How to Play Trumpet. By 1990 he had embarked on a dual vocation as broadcaster for BFBS, BBC World Service, Jazz FM (1991–92) and BBC Radios 2 and 3 (1992–98), including occasionally deputising for Humphrey Lyttelton on his show Best of Jazz and successively presenting Jazz Parade and Jazz Notes.

In 2016, Fairweather founded The Jazz Centre UK, a registered charity (no. 1167421) whose aim is to promote, preserve and celebrate the culture of jazz in all its forms.

Awards and honors
 Musician of the Year, BBC Jazz Society, 1979
 Freedom, City of London, 1992
 British Jazz Award (trumpet), 1992
 Benno Haussmann Award, Cork Jazz Festival, 1993
 Freedom of Southend on Sea, Millennium Role of Honour, 2000
 Top Small Group (Digby's Half Dozen), British Jazz Awards, 2005, 2006, 2008–2015
 Lifetime Achievement Award for Services to Jazz, Worshipful Company of Musicians London, 2013
 Services to British Jazz, British Jazz Awards, 2015

Discography

As leader/co-leader
 Havin' Fun (Black Lion, 1979)
 Going Out Stepping (Black Lion, 1979)
 Songs for Sandy (Hep, 1981)
 Anytime, Any Place, Anywhere (Hep, 1982)
 A Portrait of Digby Fairweather (Black Lion, 1991)
 Mick Potts Tribute Concert (Flat Five, 1993)
 Squeezin' the Blues Away with Tony Compton (FMR, 1994)
 The Quality of Mercer (with Susannah McCorkle, Keith Ingham (Jazz Alliance, 1996)
 Twelve Feet Off the Ground (Flat Five, 1998)
 Singing and Swinging the Blues with George Melly (Robinwood Productions, 2003)
 Things Ain't What They Used to Be  (Robinwood, 2003)
 The Ultimate Melly (Candid, 2006)
 Two Part Conversations with Craig Milverton (Raymersound, 2006)
 Partners in Time with Pete Strange (Rose Cottage, 2006)
 Farewell Blues with George Melly (Lake, 2007)
 Jazz at the Stone Hall with Dave Claridge (Rose Cottage, 2009)
 Crackerbarrel Music (Hainault, 2011)
 To Frederick with Affection (Rose Cottage, 2012)

Publications
  
 
 
 On the Road with George Melly: the Final Bows of a Legend JR Books, 2007
Ace of Clubs: A Celebration of the 100 Club, Foreword by Jools Holland, Edited by Digby Fairweather, 2021, ISBN 9781858587288

References

External links
 Official site

1946 births
Living people
British jazz horn players
People from Rochford
People from Southend-on-Sea
Hep Records artists
Black Lion Records artists